Julius Tarmisto (or Julius Grünberg; 14 December 1890 Otepää – 4 September 1956 Tallinn) was an Estonian politician. He was a member of the Estonian Constituent Assembly. On 23 April 1919, he resigned his position and he was replaced by Kristjan Haho.

References

1890 births
1956 deaths
People from Otepää
People from Kreis Dorpat
Farmers' Assemblies politicians
Members of the Estonian Constituent Assembly